Gus Worland: Marathon Man is an Australian reality television series which premiered on A&E on 9 May 2014.

Development
The series was first commissioned by Foxtel (owner of A&E).

Episodes

References

External links
 
 Official Website
 Production Website

A&E (Australian TV channel) original programming
2014 Australian television series debuts
2010s Australian reality television series
English-language television shows